L'Damian Washington (born May 10, 1991) is an American football coach and former wide receiver. He was a member of the Dallas Cowboys, San Francisco 49ers, New York Giants, Cleveland Browns, Miami Dolphins, Pittsburgh Steelers, Kansas City Chiefs, Edmonton Eskimos, Winnipeg Blue Bombers, Birmingham Iron, and St. Louis BattleHawks. He played college football at Missouri. Washington currently serves as Interim wide receiver coach for the South Florida Bulls.

Early years
Washington attended Green Oaks High School, where he played football and basketball. As a junior, he earned All-district honors after making 7 interceptions while playing at cornerback.

As a senior, he registered 53 receptions for 1,064 yards and 12 touchdowns at wide receiver, while having 4 interceptions on defense. In one game he posted 6 receptions for 257 yards and 3 touchdowns. He was a team captain and a First-team All-district selection. He was named the offensive MVP at the inaugural Sportsman's Paradise All-Star Game in Louisiana.

College career
Washington accepted a football scholarship from the University of Missouri. As a redshirt freshman, he appeared in 12 games (one start), collecting 5 receptions for 35 yards.

The next year, he recorded 20 receptions for 364 yards (18.2-yard average) and 3 touchdowns. He earned the full-time starter job as a junior, registering 25 receptions for 443 yards (17.7-yard average) and 2 touchdowns.

In 2013, Washington finished his senior season with 50 receptions for 893 yards (17.9-yard average) and 10 touchdowns, including a 96-yard touchdown catch against the University of South Carolina. He was limited with a left turf toe during the final five games of the season. He was also voted a team captain the same year.

Professional career

Dallas Cowboys
Washington was signed as an undrafted free agent by the Dallas Cowboys after the 2014 NFL Draft. He suffered a right shoulder injury in June, that forced him to miss most of the organized team activities. He returned in time for the start of training camp, but injuries on the defensive line forced the team to waive him on August 2.

San Francisco 49ers
Washington was claimed off waivers by the San Francisco 49ers on August 3, 2014. He was cut on August 30.

New York Giants
Washington was signed to the New York Giants practice squad on September 16, 2014. He was released on September 24.

Cleveland Browns
Washington was signed to the Cleveland Browns practice squad on October 21, 2014. He was waived on November 25.

Miami Dolphins
Washington was signed to the Miami Dolphins practice squad on December 3, 2014.

Pittsburgh Steelers
The Pittsburgh Steelers signed Washington to a futures contract on January 8, 2015. On May 21, he was placed on the injured reserve list and was waived injured 5 days later, after splitting his calf in two and tearing it off the bone.

Kansas City Chiefs
Washington signed with the Kansas City Chiefs on August 3, 2015. He was released by the team on August 30.

Edmonton Eskimos
On September 1, 2016, Washington was signed by the Edmonton Eskimos of the Canadian Football League. He was released from the practice roster on September 13.

Winnipeg Blue Bombers
On May 31, 2017, he signed with the Winnipeg Blue Bombers of the Canadian Football League. He started in the season opener against the Saskatchewan Roughriders, tallying 2 receptions for 38 yards and one touchdown. He appeared in 8 games, registering 24 receptions for 246 yards and two touchdown. He was cut on May 1, 2018.

Birmingham Iron
On September 14, 2018, Washington signed with the Birmingham Iron of the Alliance of American Football for the 2019 season. The league ceased operations in April 2019.

St. Louis BattleHawks
In October 2019, Washington was selected by the St. Louis BattleHawks as part of the 2020 XFL Draft. On February 9, 2020 he started in the season opener tallying 5 receptions for 20 yards in a 15–9 win over the Dallas Renegades. In March, amid the COVID-19 pandemic, the league announced that it would be cancelling the rest of the season. Playing in all 5 games, he had 21 receptions for 252 yards and one touchdown. He had his contract terminated when the league suspended operations on April 10, 2020.

Post-playing career
Washington was head football coach at West Middle School in Columbia, Missouri for the Fall 2019 and 2020 season.

In January 2022, Washington joined the Oklahoma Sooners football staff as an offensive analyst and assistant wide receivers coach. On August 7, 2022, following the sudden resignation of wide receivers coach Cale Gundy, Washington was appointed to the role on an interim basis by head coach Brent Venables.

Personal life
Washington is a motivational speaker. He graduated from the University of Missouri with a psychology degree in 4 years, despite having lost both of his parents at an early age. His father was murdered when he was only 6, and his mother had a stroke and died after one of his high school basketball games when he was only 15.

Washington is one of four brothers (La'Courtney, Tobias, Tomarious), once their mom had passed they had all decided to remain together as one taking care of each other, with La’Courtney becoming their legal guardian. Washington was accompanied by his best friends and also high school teammates; Joshua, Roovelroe and Jordan. L'Damian's best friend was murdered when he was only 15.

References

External links
L'Damian Washington continues the fight
Athlete Spotlight: The L'Damian Washington Story
Missouri Tigers Bio
L'Damian Washington  Stats

1991 births
Living people
Players of American football from Shreveport, Louisiana
American football wide receivers
Cleveland Browns players
Dallas Cowboys players
Edmonton Elks players
Missouri Tigers football players
New York Giants players
Pittsburgh Steelers players
San Francisco 49ers players
Birmingham Iron players
St. Louis BattleHawks players